Allianssi may refer to:
 Allianssi Vantaa, a Finish football club
 Suomen nuorisoalan kattojärjestö Allianssi ry, the Finnish National Youth Council